Tõnis Vares (23 July 1859 – 27 June 1925 Tallinn) was an Estonian politician.

In 1920 he was Minister of Finance.

References

1859 births
1925 deaths
People from Põltsamaa Parish
People from Kreis Fellin
Eastern Orthodox Christians from Estonia
Finance ministers of Estonia
Saint Petersburg State University alumni